Yaylacık is a village in the Nilüfer district of Bursa Province in Turkey.

References

Villages in Nilüfer District